ParaSurf is a molecular modelling system using semi-empirical orbital programs to construct molecular surfaces and calculate local properties and descriptors using pharmaceutical companies for drug design.

ParaSurf is supplied to and used by many pharmaceutical companies and biotechs, including Boehringer Ingelheim, F. Hoffmann-La Roche and Sanofi-Aventis.

References

Molecular modelling software
Biological techniques and tools
Bioinformatics software
Science software for Linux
Proprietary commercial software for Linux